Dorcadion cinctellum is a species of beetle in the family Cerambycidae. It was described by Fairmaire in 1866. It is found in Turkey and Syria.

References

cinctellum
Beetles described in 1866